Close Assault is a 1982 computer wargame published by Avalon Hill.

Gameplay
Close Assault is a game in which the player is the top-ranked officer commanding World War II squads in tactical infantry combat.

Reception
Bob Proctor reviewed the game for Computer Gaming World, and stated that "I can't say that Close Assault is Avalon Hill's best computer wargame, but it IS their best for the Apple and TRS-80. I recommend it strongly to anyone who is looking for a first computer wargame."

Reviews
Computer Gaming World -  Nov, 1991

References

External links
Review in Softalk
Review in Family Computing

1982 video games
Apple II games
Atari 8-bit family games
Avalon Hill video games
Computer wargames
TRS-80 games
Turn-based strategy video games
Video games developed in the United States
Video games set in Europe
World War II video games